"Finer Things" is a 2008 hip hop single by DJ Felli Fel. It features Kanye West, Jermaine Dupri, Fabolous, and Ne-Yo.

Release
"Finer Things" was originally released as a song by Cyssero featuring Kanye West and Ne-Yo, as part of Cyssero's 2007 mixtape The 2nd Coming. When released as a single by DJ Felli Fel featuring Kanye West, Jermaine Dupri, Fabolous and Ne-Yo, it managed to chart at number 1 on the US Billboard Bubbling Under Hot 100.

Track listing
CD single (US)
 "Finer Things" (Clean) – 4:11
 "Finer Things" (Dirty) – 4:11
 "Finer Things" (Instrumental) – 4:11

Digital download (US)
 "Finer Things" – 4:11

Charts

References

2008 singles
2008 songs
DJ Felli Fel songs
Kanye West songs
Jermaine Dupri songs
Fabolous songs
Ne-Yo songs
So So Def Recordings singles
Songs written by Jermaine Dupri
Songs written by Fabolous
Songs written by Ne-Yo
Songs written by Kanye West